Jeffery Hughes "Jeff" Andrus (March 19, 1947 – March 27, 2011) was an American author, best known for having written The Proverb (2004), adapting Pope John Paul II's 1960 play The Jeweler's Shop, Doc (1971), As Summers Die, and the Tracer Family mystery fiction series. Additionally, Andrus wrote and made a cameo appearance in the 2004 Award-Winning short film The Proverb along with Scott Waara and Nancy Stafford.

Andrus was born in King City, California and graduated from Stanford University. He married Gwyneth in about 1969. Andrus died on March 27, 2011, of congestive heart failure.

References

External links

Jeff Andrus - Official Site

1947 births
2011 deaths
People from King City, California
American male screenwriters
American male novelists
20th-century American novelists
20th-century American male writers
21st-century American novelists
21st-century American male writers
Novelists from California
Screenwriters from California
Stanford University alumni